Émile Charles Fernand Bermyn (14 October 1920 – 21 July 1973) was a French water polo player. He competed in the men's tournament at the 1948 Summer Olympics.

References

External links
 

1920 births
1973 deaths
French male water polo players
Olympic water polo players of France
Water polo players at the 1948 Summer Olympics
Sportspeople from Tourcoing